Deh Firuzvand-e Pain (also Romanized as Deh Fīrūzvand-e Pā’īn; also known as Deh Forūzvand-e Soflá, Deh Fīrūzvand, and Deh Fīrūzvand-e Soflá) is a village in Nurali Rural District, in the Central District of Delfan County, Lorestan Province, Iran. At the 2006 census, its population was 138, in 31 families.

References 

Towns and villages in Delfan County